Ust-Anuy is a rural locality (a selo) and the administrative center of Ust-Anuysky Selsoviet of Bystroistoksky District, Altai Krai, Russia. The population was 262 as of 2016. There are 3 streets.

Geography 
Ust-Anuy is located at the mouth of the Anuy river, 32 km east of Bystry Istok (the district's administrative centre) by road. Starotaryshkino is the nearest rural locality.

Ethnicity 
The village is inhabited by Russians and others.

References 

Rural localities in Bystroistoksky District